This is a list of events that happened in 2007 in Mexico.

Incumbents

Federal government
 President: Felipe Calderón 

 Interior Secretary (SEGOB): Francisco Javier Ramírez Acuña
 Secretary of Foreign Affairs (SRE): Patricia Espinosa
 Communications Secretary (SCT): Luis Téllez
 Education Secretary (SEP): Josefina Vázquez Mota
 Secretary of Defense (SEDENA): Guillermo Galván Galván
 Secretary of Navy (SEMAR): Mariano Francisco Saynez Mendoza
 Secretary of Labor and Social Welfare (STPS): Javier Lozano Alarcón
 Secretary of Welfare (SEDESOL): Beatriz Zavala
 Tourism Secretary (SECTUR): Rodolfo Elizondo Torres
 Secretary of the Environment (SEMARNAT): Juan Rafael Elvira Quesada
 Secretary of Health (SALUD): José Ángel Córdova
Secretary of Public Security (SSP): Genaro García Luna
Secretary of Finance and Public Credit (SHCP): Agustín Carstens
Secretariat of Energy (Mexico) (SENER): Georgina Yamilet Kessel Martínez, starting December 1
Secretary of Agriculture (SAGARPA): Alberto Cárdenas
Secretary of Public Function (FUNCIÓN PÚBLICA) 
German Martínez Cázares, until November 8
Salvador Vega Casillas, starting November 8
Secretary of Agrarian Reform (SRA): Germán Martínez
Secretary of Economy (SE): Eduardo Sojo Garza-Aldape
Attorney General of Mexico (PRG): Eduardo Medina-Mora Icaza

Supreme Court

 President of the Supreme Court: Guillermo Iberio Ortiz Mayagoitia

Governors

 Aguascalientes: Luis Armando Reynoso 
 Baja California: Eugenio Elorduy Walther 
 Baja California Sur: Narciso Agúndez Montaño 
 Campeche: Jorge Carlos Hurtado Valdez 
 Chiapas: Juan Sabines Guerrero, Coalition for the Good of All
 Chihuahua: José Reyes Baeza Terrazas 
 Coahuila: Humberto Moreira 
 Colima: Gustavo Vázquez Montes 
 Durango: Ismael Hernández 
 Guanajuato: Juan Manuel Oliva 
 Guerrero: Zeferino Torreblanca 
 Hidalgo: Miguel Ángel Osorio Chong 
 Jalisco: Gerardo Solís Gómez , substitute governor
 State of Mexico: Enrique Peña Nieto 
 Michoacán: Lázaro Cárdenas Batel 
 Morelos: Marco Antonio Adame 
 Nayarit: Ney González Sánchez
 Nuevo León: Fernando Canales Clariond 
 Oaxaca: Ulises Ruiz Ortiz 
 Puebla: Mario Plutarco Marín Torres 
 Querétaro: Francisco Garrido Patrón 
 Quintana Roo: Félix González Canto 
 San Luis Potosí: Jesús Marcelo de los Santos 
 Sinaloa: Jesús Aguilar Padilla 
 Sonora: Eduardo Bours 
 Tabasco: Andrés Granier Melo , starting January 1
 Tamaulipas: Eugenio Hernández Flores 
 Tlaxcala: Alfonso Sánchez Anaya 
 Veracruz: Fidel Herrera Beltrán 
 Yucatán: Víctor Cervera Pacheco 
 Zacatecas: Amalia García 
Head of Government of the Federal District: Marcelo Ebrard

Events

 The Tortilla Price Stabilization Pact is agreed on. 
 January 2: Operation Baja California 
 January 11: The government of the state of Coahuila approves a Civil Solidarity Pact ("Pacto Civil de Solidaridad") that permits same sex civil unions statewide. Becoming the second local government to permit same-sex civil unions in Mexico.
 April 20–26: 2007 tornado outbreak sequence
 May 28: Miss Universe 2007 
 June 15: Miss Latin America 2007
 September 20: 2007 Universal Forum of Cultures 
 October: 2007 Tabasco flood 
 October 6: Nuestra Belleza México 2007 
 October 21: Kab 101

Hurricanes

 May 29 – June 2: Tropical Storm Barbara (2007) 
 August 13–27: Hurricane Dean Effects of Hurricane Dean in Mexico 
 August 30 – September 6: Hurricane Henriette (2007) 
 September 25–27: Hurricane Lorenzo (2007) 
 October 15–23: Tropical Storm Kiko (2007)

Elections

 2007 Mexican elections

Awards

	
Belisario Domínguez Medal of Honor	- Carlos Castillo Peraza (post mortem)
Order of the Aztec Eagle	
National Prize for Arts and Sciences	
National Public Administration Prize	
Ohtli Award
 José Cisneros
 Gerald Richard Barnes

Popular culture

Sports 

 Primera División de México Clausura 2007
 Primera División de México Apertura 2007 
 2007 North American SuperLiga 
 2007 InterLiga 
 2007 Recopa Sudamericana 
 2007 Copa Sudamericana 
 Copa Pachuca 2006 
 2007 Rally México 
 2007 NASCAR Corona Series season 
 2007 Gran Premio Tecate 
 Homenaje a Dos Leyendas (2007) 
 2007 CONCACAF and CONMEBOL Beach Soccer Championship 
 2007 FIVB Volleyball Boys' U19 World Championship 
 2007 Women's Pan-American Volleyball Cup
 World Chess Championship 2007 
 Mexico at the 2007 Pan American Games 
 Mexican football transfers 2006–07

Music

Film

 List of 2007 box office number-one films in Mexico 
 January 12 – Fuera del cielo
 February 16 – Morirse en domingo
 March 2 – J-ok'el
 March 9 – Niñas mal
 March 13 – La última mirada
 March 30 – Cuando las cosas suceden
 May 18 – J.C. Chávez

Literature

TV

Notable deaths 

 January 2 – Sergio Jiménez, actor
 January 17 – Juan Reynoso Portillo
 January 20 – Alfredo Ripstein
 February 7 – Antonio Enríquez Savignac
 March 8 – Black Shadow
 March 12 – Antonio Ortiz Mena, economist and politician, former president of the Inter-American Development Bank
 March 16 – Pablo Emilio Madero
 March 20 – Albert Baez
 May 4 – José Antonio Roca
 June 19 – Antonio Aguilar
 June 19 – Enrique Canales
 July 4 – José Roberto Espinosa
 August 7 – Ernesto Alonso, actor, director, cinematographer, producer, pneumonia.
 October 2 – José Antonio Ríos Granados
November 29 – Juan Antonio Guajardo Anzaldúa, politician, former municipal president, Senator, and Deputy, Río Bravo, Tamaulipas; murdered.
 December 3 – Sergio Gómez, lead vocalist for K-Paz de la Sierra, murdered.

See also 
 2007 Tabasco flood

References

External links